Rhynchobombyx is a monospecific moth genus in the family Lasiocampidae first described by Per Olof Christopher Aurivillius in 1909. It contains the single species Rhynchobombyx nasuta, described by the same author.

References 

Lasiocampidae
Monotypic moth genera